Bevahites is a Cretaceous ammonite with an evolute, ribbed, tuberculate, and keeled shell with a squarish to compressed whorl section.

Bevahites is a member of the collignoniceratid subfamily Texanitinae as well as of the Acanthoceratoidea and has been found in Upper Santonian to middle Campanian sediments in southern Africa and Madagascar.

Barrisioceras, Menabites,  and Parabevahites  are among related genera.

References
Notes

Bibliography
Arkell, et al., 1957. Mesozoic Ammonoidea; Treatise on Invertebrate Paleontology, Part L. Geological Society of America and University of Kansas Press.

Cretaceous ammonites
Cretaceous animals of Africa
Santonian genus first appearances
Campanian genus extinctions
Collignoniceratidae
Ammonitida genera